Eliza Gladys Dean (2 February 1912 – 31 May 2009), known as Millvina Dean, was a British civil servant, cartographer, and the last living survivor of the sinking of the RMS Titanic on 15 April 1912. At two months old, she was also the youngest passenger aboard.

Family
Dean was born in Branscombe, Devon, England, on 2 February 1912, to Bertram Frank Dean (1886–1912) and Georgette Eva Light (1879–1975). She had an older brother, Bertram Vere Dean, born 21 May 1910. She never married and had no children. Her father died on the Titanic; her mother died on 16 September 1975, aged 96; and her brother died on 14 April 1992, age 81, the 80th anniversary of the iceberg collision.

Aboard the Titanic
Dean's parents decided to leave the United Kingdom and emigrate to the United States; they were planning to move to Wichita, Kansas, where her father had relatives, and his cousin owned a tobacco shop that he was going to co-own. They were not supposed to be aboard the Titanic, but due to a coal strike, they were transferred onto it and boarded it as third-class passengers at Southampton, England. Dean was nine weeks old when she boarded the ship. Her father felt its collision with the iceberg on the night of 14 April 1912, and after investigating, returned to his cabin, telling his wife to dress the children and go up on deck. Dean, her mother, and her brother were placed in Lifeboat 10. Her father did not survive, and his body, if recovered, was never identified.

Return to the United Kingdom

As was the case with many of Titanics immigrant widows, Etta Dean surrendered any notion of remaining in the United States once it was clear her husband had not been saved. In the 2000 PBS documentary Lost Liners, in giving her account of the disaster, Millvina described the state her mother was in during the aftermath of the disaster:

The White Star Line offered Etta and her children passage back to England aboard . While aboard the ship, Dean attracted considerable attention. An article in the Daily Mirror dated 12 May 1912 described the ordeal:

Later years
It was not until Dean was in her seventies that she became involved in Titanic-related events. Over the years, she participated in numerous conventions, exhibitions, documentaries, radio and television interviews, and personal correspondence. In 1997, Dean sailed to New York, along with several members of the Titanic Historical Society, aboard the Queen Elizabeth 2 (QE2). After a few days in New York, she travelled to Kansas City, and visited the house that her uncle owned, and to where her family was going to settle. Several of her uncle's descendants met her for the first time. In 1998, she travelled to the United States to participate in a Titanic convention in Springfield, Massachusetts, and another in 1999 in Montreal, Quebec. She had also been scheduled to appear at a commemoration of the 94th anniversary of the sinking in 2006, but a broken hip prevented her appearance. She also appeared in the History special Titanic's Final Moments: Missing Pieces.

Dean staunchly refused to see James Cameron's film Titanic (1997). She recalled having nightmares after seeing A Night to Remember (1958), the film based on Walter Lord's book, and did not wish to imagine her father as one of the people in the crowd of passengers stranded on the sinking liner. She declined invitations to the premieres of Titanic and Ghosts of the Abyss (2003). In December 2007, she also criticised the BBC and its television programme Doctor Who for including an episode with a starship "cruise liner" called the Titanic which was similar in appearance to the historical liner. Speaking from her nursing home, she said: "The Titanic was a tragedy which tore so many families apart. I lost my father and he lies on that wreck. I think it is disrespectful to make entertainment of such a tragedy." A spokeswoman for the show said: "No offence was intended. 'Voyage of the Damned' is set on a spaceship called The Titanic and not a boat."

Health issues
In April 2008, Dean had accepted an invitation to speak in Southampton at an event commemorating the 96th anniversary of the sinking, but ill health resulting from a respiratory infection forced her to cancel.

In December 2008, at age 96, Dean was forced to sell several of her family's possessions to pay for her private medical care following a broken hip. These included a letter sent to her mother from the Titanic Relief Fund, and a suitcase given to her and her mother in New York following the sinking. Their sale raised approximately £32,000. In February 2009, she announced that she would be selling several more items to pay for her increasing nursing home costs which she said exceeded £3,000 a month.

Death
Dean died of pneumonia on the morning of 31 May 2009, 97 years and seven weeks after the Titanic sailed, at a care home in Ashurst, Hampshire. She was cremated, and on 24 October 2009, her ashes were scattered from a launch at the docks in Southampton where the Titanic set sail. Since October 2007, Dean had been the last Titanic survivor, following the death of Barbara West Dainton, who died aged 96 in England.

The Millvina Fund
In response to the escalating cost of Dean's care, The Millvina Fund was set up in April 2009 by the Belfast, British, and International Titanic Societies with the exclusive aim of taking care of her nursing home bills. It was given a boost by the Irish author and campaigning journalist Don Mullan at the opening of his worldwide Nokia photographic exhibition, A Thousand Reasons for Living (featuring a portrait of Dean), in Dublin on 22 April 2009. Mullan introduced an additional portrait of Dean's hands, as she signed a card for a Titanic autograph collector, which he produced as a limited edition of 100 copies. He made the edition available at €500 each and then challenged the director and stars of the film Titanic (1997) – James Cameron, Leonardo DiCaprio, and Kate Winslet – singer Celine Dion, and the corporations Sony Music, 20th Century Fox, and Paramount Pictures to match him euro-for-euro to support her with her bills. DiCaprio and Winslet led the way with a joint contribution of US$20,000. Cameron and Dion donated US$10,000 each.

See also
 Grace Hanagan, last survivor of the Empress of Ireland disaster
 Audrey Pearl, last survivor of the Lusitania sinking
 Adella Wotherspoon, last survivor of the General Slocum disaster
Catherine Uhlmyer, longest-lived survivor of the General Slocum disaster

References

External links
 Miss Elizabeth Gladys 'Millvina' Dean – Encyclopedia Titanica biography
 Millvina Dean – Daily Telegraph obituary
 Titanic Survivor gets Mayoral Tribute Southern Daily Echo, 7 May 2007

1912 births
2009 deaths
British cartographers
Women cartographers
Deaths from pneumonia in England
People from East Devon District
People from New Forest District
Scientists from Southampton
RMS Titanic's crew and passengers
People educated at The Gregg School
RMS Titanic survivors
20th-century cartographers